The 1982 ICF Canoe Sprint World Championships were held in Belgrade, Yugoslavia for the record fourth time. The Yugoslavian (now Serbian) city had host the championships previously in 1971, 1975, and 1978.

The men's competition consisted of six Canadian (single paddle, open boat) and nine kayak events. Three events were held for the women, all in kayak.

This was the seventeenth championships in canoe sprint.

Medal summary

Men's

Canoe

Kayak

Women's

Kayak

Medals table

References
ICF medalists for Olympic and World Championships - Part 1: flatwater (now sprint): 1936-2007.
ICF medalists for Olympic and World Championships - Part 2: rest of flatwater (now sprint) and remaining canoeing disciplines: 1936-2007.

Icf Canoe Sprint World Championships, 1982
Icf Canoe Sprint World Championships, 1982
ICF Canoe Sprint World Championships
International sports competitions hosted by Yugoslavia
Canoeing and kayaking competitions in Yugoslavia
1980s in Belgrade
International sports competitions in Belgrade
1982 in Serbia